is the fourth studio album by Japanese singer and songwriter Miho Komatsu. It was released on 7 March 2001 through Giza Studio label.

Background
The album includes 3 previously released singles, such as Anata ga Iru kara, Kimi no Me ni wa Utsuranai and Love Gone.

Love Gone received special arrangement in this album under title album mix. In compare with a single version, the beginning has lower tune and different instrumentation.

Kanashii Koi has been previously released as b-side track in her single Anata ga Iru Kara.

Some of songs from this album, included Tada Soba ni Itai no, Kanashii Koi, I don't know the truth and Regret were released in her conceptual album Lyrics in 2003.

Love Gone was included in the Giza Studio's compilation album Giza Studio Masterpiece Blend 2001.

Charting
The album reached #9 in its first week with 40,990 copies sold. The album charted for 5 weeks and sold 63,920 copies in total.

This is last album to reach top 10 on the Oricon charts.

Track listing 
All tracks are arranged by Yoshinobu Ohga (Nothin' but love) expect of track #2 (by Daisuke Ikeda)

Usage in media
Hold me tight
Used in the PlayStation 2 game Missing Blue as the opening theme
Anata ga Iru kara
Used in the Anime television series film Detective Conan: Captured in Her Eyes as the theme song
Kimi no Me ni wa Utsuranai
for TV Ohsaka program Ame Rock  as the ending theme
I don't know the truth
for PlayStation 2 game Missing Blue  as the ending theme
Love Gone
for Tokyo Broadcasting System Television program Kokoro TV  as the ending theme
for Nichion radio music program P.S. Pop Shake  as the opening theme

References

2001 albums
Miho Komatsu songs
Songs written by Miho Komatsu
2001 songs
Giza Studio albums
Japanese-language albums
Being Inc. albums
Albums produced by Daiko Nagato